Shri Brij Bhushan Tiwari (13 October 1941 – 25 April 2012) was a politician of the Samajwadi Party who was a Member of parliament, Rajya Sabha representing Uttar Pradesh in the Rajya Sabha, the upper house of the Indian Parliament. The first time he took the oath as a member of parliament in the upper house was in December 2006 and second time was on 24 April 2012. He was a Member of parliament, Lok Sabha for 3 times; 1977,1989 & 1996. He was also a National  Vice President of Samajwadi Party. He died on the following night of 24 April 2012 in Delhi.

External links
 Profile on Rajya Sabha website
 Profile on samajwadi party website

2012 deaths
Samajwadi Party politicians
Rajya Sabha members from Uttar Pradesh
Lok Sabha members from Uttar Pradesh
Janata Dal politicians
1941 births
Bharatiya Lok Dal politicians
Samajwadi Party politicians from Uttar Pradesh